Coppins is a country house north of the village of Iver in Buckinghamshire, England, formerly a home of members of the British royal family, including Princess Victoria, Prince George, Duke of Kent, Princess Marina, Duchess of Kent and Prince Edward, Duke of Kent (their son).

History
The house was originally a mid-nineteenth-century farmhouse built by John Mitchell, who arranged theatre visits for Queen Victoria and the Prince of Wales. The house was substantially altered for Princess Victoria, who moved there after the death in 1925 of her mother Queen Alexandra. 

Princess Victoria left Coppins to her nephew Prince George, Duke of Kent, when she died in 1935. From then until it was sold in 1972 to Commander Eli Gottlieb, it was the home of two generations of the Kent family.

Prince Philip, Duke of Edinburgh was a regular visitor to Coppins during school holidays while at Gordonstoun (1937–39) and Dartmouth Naval College (1939–40), and later when visiting with Princess Elizabeth. Prince George’s wife, Princess Marina, was Prince Philip’s paternal first cousin.

Prince Michael of Kent was born there on 4 July 1942. In 1944, Princess Marina's first cousin George II of Greece also stayed at Coppins.

References

Country houses in Buckinghamshire
Royal residences in England